Mahnaz is a female given name. Notable people named Mahnaz include:

 Mahnaz Afkhami (born 1941), Iranian politician and women's rights activist
 Mahnaz Afshar (born 1977), Iranian actress
 Mahnaz Angury (born c.1998), Afghan-born Australian journalist and interpreter
 Mahnaz Bahmani (born 1970), Iranian politician
 Mahnaz Fattahi, Iranian Kurdish author and oral historian
 Mahnaz Malik (born 1977), British-Pakistani barrister, arbitrator and author
 Mahnaz Mohammadi (born 1975),Iranian filmmaker and women's rights activist
 Mahnaz Samadi, Iranian dissident and human rights activist
 Mahnaz Shirali, Iranian author and political sociologist

Iranian feminine given names